Hugh Wishart was an American silversmith, active in New York City from 1793-1824. He had shops at 62 Wall Street, 98 Market Street, 319 Pearl Street (1797), 5 Rector Street (1808), and 66 Maiden Lane (1810). In 1806 he served as a fireman in Company 16. His work is collected in the Art Institute of Chicago, Dallas Museum of Art, Metropolitan Museum of Art, and Nelson-Atkins Museum of Art.

References 
 "Hugh Wishart", Sterling Flatware Fashions.
 "Hugh Wishart", Online Encyclopedia of Silver Marks, Hallmarks, and Makers' Marks.
 American Silversmiths and Their Marks: The Definitive (1948) Edition, Stephen G. C. Ensko, Courier Corporation, 2012.
 "Silversmiths and Related Craftsmen", Longworth's 1808 New York City Directory.
 Minutes of the Common Council of the City of New York, 1784-1831, Volume 4, New York (N.Y.). Common Council, M.B. Brown Printing & Binding Company for the City of New York, 1917, page 153.

American silversmiths